Stranger Things: Halloween Sounds from the Upside Down is a supplemental compilation soundtrack album with unreleased cues used in the second season of the Netflix series Stranger Things that had a digital release on October 5, 2018, via Lakeshore and Invada Records. The music on the album was produced by the series' longtime composers Kyle Dixon and Michael Stein of the electronic band Survive, and was previously available only as bonus tracks for the iTunes edition of the soundtrack album for Stranger Things 2. The album was also released physically as an orange-colored vinyl record and a picture disc for an exclusive limited run on Record Store Day's annual Black Friday event.

Track listing

Notes
 The track "Controlled Contamination" from the iTunes edition of Stranger Things 2 is not included. Along with this, the order of tracks 7-10 is slightly different on the iTunes edition (tracks 10, 8, 7 and 9, respectively).

References

Music of Stranger Things
Television soundtracks
2018 soundtrack albums
2018 compilation albums